The Bedlah or Badlet Ra'as is a traditional Egyptian folklore costume mostly worn by women, but in some Egyptian weddings men dancers wear it too. The word badlah is an Egyptian Arabic for "suit".

In Egyptian belly dancing clubs, the term badlah refers simply to the costume that a dancer wears. Most commonly it is used to refer to the matched set of bra and belt that cabaret dancers use, but technically it encompasses all parts of the dancer's costume as well, such as the jewelry, headband, skirt, pants and veil.  This is often referred to as a Complete Badlah. Occasionally it also refers to just one piece of the costume such as the highly ornate belt that tribal dancers wear which may or may not have a matching bra. The term Badlah hardwear refers to the more sturdy portions of the dancer's costume, the bra, belt and jewelry and the term Bedlah softwear includes the flowing fabric portions of the costume, the skirt, pants, vest, choli and/or veil. Badlah got  in the Western imagination of Victorian painters and was adopted by dancers who catered to foreign audiences who expected the look. Many dancers also adopted the look simply because they liked it, and it has survived to become the most popular costume for Egyptian belly dancers and oriental dancers across the globe.

References

Egyptian clothing
Egyptian culture
Egyptian dances